Marquess  was a Japanese statesman and a prominent member of the Meiji oligarchy. He served as Prime Minister of the Empire of Japan in 1898 and from 1914 to 1916. Ōkuma was also an early advocate of Western science and culture in Japan, and founder of Waseda University. He is considered a centrist.

Early life

Ōkuma Hachitarō was born on March 11, 1838, in Saga, Hizen Province (modern day Saga Prefecture), the first son of Ōkuma Nobuyasu and Miiko. His father was a samurai-class artillery officer of the Saga Domain, and the family were a high-ranking samurai family who had a 300 koku territory.

At the age of seven, he entered the domain school Kōdōkan and studied mainly Confucian literature, the teachings of Cheng–Zhu school in particular. In 1854, he rebelled against the education of the school with his fellow students. He was expelled the next year for rioting. At this point, he had moved to a Dutch studies institution.

The Dutch school was merged with the provincial school in 1861, and Ōkuma took up a lecturing position there shortly afterward. Ōkuma sympathized with the sonnō jōi movement, which aimed at expelling the Europeans who had started to arrive in Japan. However, he also advocated mediation between the rebels in Chōshū and the Tokugawa shogunate in Edo.

During a trip to Nagasaki, Ōkuma met a Dutch missionary named Guido Verbeck, who taught him the English language and provided him with copies of the New Testament and the American Declaration of Independence, as well as works on scientific subjects. The political works are often said to have affected his political thinking profoundly, and encouraged him to support efforts to abolish the existing feudal system and work toward the establishment of a constitutional government.

Ōkuma frequently traveled between Nagasaki and Kyoto in the following years and became active in the Meiji Restoration. In 1867, together with Soejima Taneomi, he planned to recommend resignation to the shōgun Tokugawa Yoshinobu. Leaving Saga Domain without permission, they went to Kyoto, where the shōgun then resided. However, Ōkuma and his companions were arrested and sent back to Saga. They were subsequently sentenced to one month imprisonment.

Meiji period political life

Following the Boshin War of the Meiji Restoration in 1868, Okuma was placed in charge of foreign affairs for the new Meiji government. At this time, he negotiated with British diplomat, Sir Harry Smith Parkes on the ban of Christianity and insisted on maintaining the government's persecution on Catholics in Nagasaki.

In 1873, the Japanese government removed the ban on Christianity.

He was soon given an additional post as head of Japan's monetary reform program. He made use of his close contacts with Inoue Kaoru to secure a position in the central government in Tokyo. He was elected to the first Diet of Japan in 1870 and soon became Minister of Finance, in which capacity he instituted property and taxation reforms that aided Japan's early industrial development. He presided over the commission which represented the Japanese government at the 1873 Vienna World's Fair.

He also unified the nation's currency, created the national mint, and a separate Minister of Industry; however, he was dismissed in 1881 after a long series of disagreements with members of the Satsuma and Chōshū clique in the Meiji oligarchy, most notably Itō Hirobumi, over his efforts to secure foreign loans, to establish a constitution, and especially over his exposure of illicit property dealings involving Prime Minister Kuroda Kiyotaka and others from Satsuma.

In 1882, Ōkuma co-founded the Constitutional Progressive Party (Rikken Kaishintō) which soon attracted a number of other leaders, including Ozaki Yukio and Inukai Tsuyoshi.  That same year, Ōkuma founded the Tokyo Senmon Gakkō in the Waseda district of Tokyo. The school later became Waseda University, one of the country's most prominent institutions of higher education.

Despite their continuing animosity, Itō again appointed Ōkuma to the post of Foreign Minister in February 1888 to deal with the difficult issue of negotiation revisions to the "unequal treaties" with the Western powers. The treaty he negotiated was perceived by the public as too conciliatory to the Western powers, and created considerable controversy. Ōkuma was attacked by a member of the Gen'yōsha in 1889, and his right leg was blown off by a bomb. He retired from politics at that time.

However, he returned to politics in 1896 by reorganizing the Rikken Kaishintō into the Shimpotō (Progressive Party). In 1897, Matsukata Masayoshi convinced Ōkuma to participate in his second administration as Foreign Minister and Agriculture and Commerce Minister, but again, he remained in office for only one year before resigning as a result of intrigues involving the prime minister.

In June 1898, Ōkuma co-founded the Kenseitō (Constitutional Government Party), by merging his Shimpotō with Itagaki Taisuke's Jiyūtō, and was appointed by the Emperor to form the first partisan cabinet in Japanese history. The new cabinet survived for only four months before it fell apart due to internal dissension. Ōkuma remained in charge of the party until 1908, when he retired from politics.

After his political retirement, Ōkuma became president of Waseda University and chairman of the Japan Civilization Society, from which scholars' many translations of European and American texts were published. He also gathered support for Japan's first expedition to Antarctica.

Taishō period political life

At the request of the Emperor, Ōkuma returned to politics during the constitutional crisis of 1914, when the government of Yamamoto Gonnohyōe was forced to resign in the wake of the Siemens scandal. Ōkuma organized his supporters, together with the Rikken Dōshikai and Chūseikai organizations, into a coalition cabinet. The 2nd Ōkuma administration was noted for its active foreign policy. Later that year, Japan declared war on the German Empire, thus entering World War I on the Allied side. However, the government suffered defeat in December, over the army budget.

In 1915, Ōkuma and Katō Takaaki drafted the Twenty-One Demands on China. Ōkuma won re-election in March of that year, but his second administration was also short-lived. Following the Ōura scandal, Ōkuma's cabinet lost popular support, and its members held mass resignation in October 1915. Still, Ōkuma was persuaded to continue in office for a while, and during the year treaties were concluded with France, Russia and China. Later in 1916, after a long argument with the Genrō, Ōkuma resigned as well, and retired from politics permanently, although he remained a member of the Upper House of the Diet of Japan until 1922. He was awarded the Grand Cordon of the Supreme Order of the Chrysanthemum in 1916, and was elevated to the title of kōshaku (marquis) in the kazoku peerage system the same year.

Ōkuma returned to Waseda, and died there in 1922. An estimated 300,000 people attended his funeral in Tokyo's Hibiya Park. He was posthumously conferred with the Collar of the Order of the Chrysanthemum, the nation's highest honour. He was buried at the temple of Gokoku-ji in Tokyo.

Honours
From the corresponding article in the Japanese Wikipedia

Peerages
Count (May 9, 1887)
Marquess (July 14, 1916)

Decorations
Grand Cordon of the Order of the Rising Sun (November 2, 1877)
Grand Cordon of the Order of the Rising Sun with Paulownia Flowers (April 29, 1910)
Collar of the Order of the Chrysanthemum (January 10, 1922, posthumous; Grand Cordon: July 14, 1916)

Court order of precedence
Fifth rank, junior grade (1867)
Fourth rank, junior grade (1868)
Senior fourth rank (1870)
Third rank (July 22, 1871)
Senior third rank (December 26, 1887)
Second rank (February 17, 1888)
Senior second rank (June 20, 1898)
First rank (January 10, 1922 – posthumous)

Notes

References
 Beasley, W.G. (1963). The Making of Modern Japan. London: Weidenfeld and Nicolson.
 Borton, Hugh (1955). Japan's Modern Century. New York: The Ronald Press Company.
 
 
 Idditti, Smimasa. Life of Marquis Shigenobu Okuma: A Maker of New Japan. Kegan Paul International Ltd. (2006). 
 Idditti, Junesay. Marquis Shigenobu Okuma – A Biographical Study in the Rise of Democratic Japan. Hokuseido Press (1956). ASIN: B000IPQ4VQ
 Lebra-Chapman, Joyce. Okuma Shigenobu: statesman of Meiji Japan. Australian National University Press (1973). 
 Oka Yoshitake, et al. Five Political Leaders of Modern Japan: Ito Hirobumi, Okuma Shigenobu, Hara Takashi, Inukai Tsuyoshi, and Saionji Kimmochi. University of Tokyo Press (1984). 
 Tokugawa Munefusa (2005). Tokugawa yonhyakunen no naisho-banashi: raibaru bushō-hen Tokyo: Bungei-shunju
 Brownas, Sidney DeVere. Nagasaki in the Meiji Restoration: Choshu Loyalists and British Arms Merchants. http://www.uwosh.edu/home_pages/faculty_staff/earns/meiji.html Retrieved on August 7, 2008.

External links

 Yomiuri Shimbun:  Less than 30% of primary school students in Japan know historical significance of Ōkuma, 2008.
Photograph of Rabindranath Tagore and Count Okuma in Japan in the South Asian American Digital Archive (SAADA)
 
 

|-

|-

|-

|-

|-

|-

|-

|-

|-

1838 births
1922 deaths
19th-century prime ministers of Japan
20th-century prime ministers of Japan
Foreign ministers of Japan
Government ministers of Japan
Japanese amputees
Japanese people of World War I
Kazoku
Kenseitō politicians
Meiji Restoration
Members of the House of Peers (Japan)
Ministers of Home Affairs of Japan
Nabeshima retainers
People from Saga (city)
People of Meiji-period Japan
Rikken Dōshikai politicians
20th-century Japanese politicians
Rikken Kaishintō politicians
19th-century Japanese politicians
Samurai
Shimpotō politicians
University and college founders
Politicians from Saga Prefecture
Burials in Japan